Eyralpenus sublutea is a moth of the family Erebidae. It was described by Max Bartel in 1903. It is found in South Africa and Tanzania.

The larvae feed on Acalypha and Morus species.

References

 

Spilosomina
Moths described in 1903